Pentagramma is a genus of delphacid planthoppers in the family Delphacidae. There are about nine described species in Pentagramma.

Species
These nine species belong to the genus Pentagramma:
 Pentagramma bivittata Crawford, 1914 i c g b
 Pentagramma cosquina Penner, 1947 i c g
 Pentagramma douglasensis Penner, 1947 i c g
 Pentagramma longistylata Penner, 1947 i c g
 Pentagramma lueri Campodonico, 2017 c g
 Pentagramma nigrifrons Muir, 1934 i c g
 Pentagramma nimbata (Berg, 1879) i c g
 Pentagramma variegata Penner, 1947 i b
 Pentagramma vittatifrons (Uhler, 1876) i c g b
Data sources: i = ITIS, c = Catalogue of Life, g = GBIF, b = Bugguide.net

References

Further reading

 
 
 
 
 
 
 
 
 
 
 

Asiracinae
Auchenorrhyncha genera